The 2013 Busan Open Challenger Tennis was a professional tennis tournament played on hard courts. It was the twelfth edition of the tournament which was part of the 2013 ATP Challenger Tour. It took place in Busan, South Korea between 13 and 19 May 2013.

Singles main-draw entrants

Seeds

 1 Rankings are as of May 6, 2013.

Other entrants
The following players received wildcards into the singles main draw:
  Chung Hyeon
  Lee Duck-hee
  Lim Yong-kyu
  Nam Ji-sung

The following players received entry from the qualifying draw:
  Laurynas Grigelis
  Yuichi Ito
  Dane Propoggia
  Jose Rubin Statham

Doubles main-draw entrants

Seeds

 1 Rankings are as of May 6, 2013.

Other entrants
The following pairs received wildcards into the doubles main draw:
  Chung Hyeon /  Nam Ji-sung
  Im Kyu-tae /  Lee Hyung-taik
  Jeong Suk-young /  Lim Yong-kyu

Champions

Singles

 Dudi Sela def.  Alex Bogomolov Jr., 6–1, 6–4

Doubles

 Peng Hsien-yin /  Yang Tsung-hua def.  Jeong Suk-young /  Lim Yong-kyu, 6–4, 6–3

External links
Official Website

Busan Open Challenger Tennis
Busan Open
May 2013 sports events in South Korea
Busan